Tanshū or Tanshu may refer to:

 Tanshū, another name for Tanba Province.
 Tanshū, another name for Tango Province.

 Tanshū, another name for Tajima Province.
 Tanba, Tango and Tajima are also called .

 Tanshū, another name for Awaji Province.